Heat Wave (original title: Coup de chaud) is a 2015 French thriller-drama film directed by Raphaël Jacoulot. It was released on 12 August 2015.

Cast 
 Jean-Pierre Darroussin as Daniel Huot-Marchand 
 Grégory Gadebois as Rodolphe Blin 
 Karim Leklou as Josef Bousou 
 Carole Franck as Diane 
 Isabelle Sadoyan as Odette
 Serra Yılmaz as Josiane Bousou
 Camille Figuereo as Bénédicte Blin
 Agathe Dronne as Valérie
 Patrick Bonnel as Jean-Louis Boibessot
 Marc Bodnar as Michel

References

External links 
 

2015 films
2015 thriller drama films
2010s French-language films
French thriller drama films
Belgian thriller drama films
Drama films based on actual events
2015 drama films
French-language Belgian films
2010s French films